The PSA World Tour 2013 is the international squash tour organised circuit organized by the Professional Squash Association (PSA) for the 2013 squash season. The most important tournament in the series is the World Championship held in Manchester in England. The tour features three categories of regular events, World Series, which feature the highest prize money and the best fields, International and Challenger. The Tour is concluded by the PSA World Series Finals, the end of season championship for the top 8 rated players.

2013 Calendar

Key

World Championship

World Series
Prize money: $115,000 and more

International
Prize money: between $25,000 and $114,999

January

February

March

April

May

August

September

October

November

December

Year end world top 10 players

Retirements
Following is a list of notable players (winners of a main tour title, and/or part of the PSA World Rankings top 30 for at least one month) who announced their retirement from professional squash, became inactive, or were permanently banned from playing, during the 2013 season:

 Wael El Hindi (born 25 June 1980 in Giza, Egypt) joined the pro tour in 1999, reached the singles no. 8 spot in 2008. He won 8 PSA World Tour titles including the US Open in 2010 and the prestigious Petrosport Open, a World Series Platinum event in Egypt, in 2008. He retired in January after competing a last time in the Tournament of Champions in New York.

See also
Professional Squash Association (PSA)
PSA World Series 2013
PSA World Rankings
PSA World Series Finals
PSA World Open
WSA World Tour 2013
2013 Men's World Team Squash Championships

References

External links
 PSA World Tour

PSA World Tour seasons
2013 in squash